The 1955–56 Beitar Tel Aviv season was the club's 23rd season since its establishment, in 1934, and 8th since the establishment of the State of Israel.

At the start of the season, the league which started during the previous season was completed, with the club finishing 5th. The new league season, with the top division being renamed Liga Leumit, began on 3 December 1955 and was completed on 3 June 1956, with the club finishing 7th.

During the season, the club also competed in the State Cup, which was also carried over the summer break. The club was eliminated in the quarter finals, after losing 0–4 to Hapoel Petah Tikva.

In addition, during the break between the completion of the 1954–55 league and the beginning of the 1955–56 league, the club participated in the Netanya 25th anniversary cup, along with Maccabi Petah Tikva, Maccabi Netanya and Hapoel Ramat Gan. In the competition, which was played as a round-robin tournament, the club finished fourth.

Match Results

Legend

1954–55 Liga Alef
The league began on 6 February 1955, and by the time the previous season ended, only 20 rounds of matches were completed, with the final 6 rounds being played during September and October 1955.

Final table

Matches

Results by match

1955–56 Liga Leumit

Final table

Matches

Results by match

State Cup

Netanya 25th Anniversary Cup
In October and November, while the promotion playoffs and the State Cup were being played, two cup competitions were organized by Liga Leumit Clubs, the second edition of the Shapira Cup, and the Netanya 25th Anniversary Cup. Maccabi Netanya, Beitar Tel Aviv, Maccabi Petah Tikva and Hapoel Ramat Gan took part in the competition, dedicated to the 25th anniversary of Netanya.

Table

References

Beitar Tel Aviv F.C. seasons
Beitar Tel Aviv